is a former Japanese football player. He played for Japan national team.

Club career
Yasuda was born on November 10, 1949. After graduating from Fukuoka University, he joined Japan Soccer League club Nippon Steel in 1972. He retired in 1980. He played 155 games in the league.

National team career
On August 23, 1979, Yasuda debuted for Japan national team against North Korea.

National team statistics

References

External links
 
 Japan National Football Team Database

1949 births
Living people
Fukuoka University alumni
Japanese footballers
Japan international footballers
Japan Soccer League players
Nippon Steel Yawata SC players
Association football goalkeepers